History of electricity can refer to:

See  for an overview
History of electromagnetic theory
History of electrical engineering
History of electric power transmission
History of electronic engineering